Duffrébo is a town in eastern Ivory Coast. It is a sub-prefecture of Agnibilékrou Department in Indénié-Djuablin Region, Comoé District.

Duffrébo was a commune until March 2012, when it became one of 1126 communes nationwide that were abolished.
In 2014, the population of the sub-prefecture of Duffrébo was 42,426.

Villages
The seventeen villages of the sub-prefecture of Duffrébo and their population in 2014 are:

References

Sub-prefectures of Indénié-Djuablin
Former communes of Ivory Coast